Since the inception of the English women's football league competition, the FA WSL, in 2011, sixteen players have scored three goals (a hat-trick) in a single match. The first player to achieve the feat was Rachel Williams. Ten players have scored more than one hat-trick and four players have achieved four goals in a game. Chelsea's 6–0 win over Bristol City in 2019 remains the only game where multiple players completed a hat-trick in the same game.

Hat-tricks

Note: The results column shows the home team score first. Numbers in brackets after players' names signifies how many goals were scored by the player.

Updated as of 21 November 2021

Multiple hat-tricks 
The following table lists the minimum number of hat-tricks scored by players who have scored two or more hat-tricks.

Perfect hat-tricks 
The following list highlights the players who have scored 'perfect' hat-tricks (header, left foot, right foot).

Notes

 The FA WSL, created in 2011, is the top tier of English women's league football. A second tier, FA WSL 2, was added in 2014.

References

External links
weltfussball.de - Hattricks since 2018

Hat-tricks
FA WSL